Jelenie Pole  is a settlement in the administrative district of Gmina Torzym, within Sulęcin County, Lubusz Voivodeship, in western Poland.

References

Jelenie Pole